is a Japanese politician of the Liberal Democratic Party, a member of the House of Representatives in the Diet (national legislature). A native of Chiyoda, Tokyo and graduate of the University of Tokyo, he joined the Ministry of Construction in 1994, which later became part of the Ministry of Land, Infrastructure and Transport. While in the ministry, he received a master's degree from the University of Cambridge in England. Leaving the ministry in 2003, he was elected to the House of Representatives for the first time in the same year.

As of 16 September 2020, Inoue serves as Minister of State in Suga Cabinet led by Yoshihide Suga.

Mori is affiliated to the openly revisionist lobby Nippon Kaigi.

References

External links
 Official website in Japanese.

1969 births
Living people
People from Chiyoda, Tokyo
University of Tokyo alumni
Members of the House of Representatives (Japan)
Alumni of the University of Cambridge
Liberal Democratic Party (Japan) politicians
Members of Nippon Kaigi
21st-century Japanese politicians